Redkey USB is a computer utility developed to securely erase data. It is sold as a bootable live USB drive from which the Redkey software can be used on a perpetual license basis.

History 
The application was first released during August 2018 following a Kickstarter crowdfunding campaign. Its features and design were partly based on the feedback of the projects supporters who contributed to its development.

During 2019, a second Redkey crowdfunding campaign went viral on Indiegogo following a video review by Linus Tech Tips. 

In 2020, a third Redkey Kickstarter crowdfunding campaign introduced ATA-based internal erase technology and split the software into three different editions – Home, Professional and Ultimate. 

During 2021, Redkey's software was certified to level 1 by ADISA Certification Limited for SSDs and MHDs. Following a re-certification process in 2022, this was upgraded to level 2.

In 2022, a fourth campaign was completed introducing a dual USB-C product design, the ability to wipe mobile devices and remote wiping capabilities.

Technology and features 
The utility is designed to run on Intel based x86-64 PCs and Mac. Redkey’s software is written in C++ and uses Linux Debian as a platform. The software utility on the USB erases data on entire drives by overwriting existing data. It uses ATA standards to erase hidden areas, such as the DCO and HPA. Other features include unlimited use, reporting, scripting and remote wipe.

References

External links 
Official website

Data erasure
Live USB
2018 software